The Turning Stone Resort Championship was a PGA Tour professional golf tournament, first played from September 20–23, 2007. It was hosted by the Atunyote Golf Club at Turning Stone Resort & Casino in Verona, New York.

In 2007, it was the first of the seven Fall Series events played after the conclusion of the FedEx Cup, which was introduced the same year. The prize fund was $6 million. The tournament's timing in the PGA Tour calendar changed in 2008: The 2008 Fall Series began before the conclusion of the FedEx Cup with the Viking Classic. After the Fall Series took a week off for The Tour Championship, it resumed with the Turning Stone Championship. In 2009, the Turning Stone Resort Championship was played the week after The Tour Championship.

In 2010, the event moved to August and become part of the main PGA Tour season, although it was an "alternate" event scheduled opposite a World Golf Championships tournament, specifically the Bridgestone Invitational. It was dropped from the PGA Tour schedule in 2011 when event organizers and the Tour could not agree on a stand-alone date for the tournament.

John Rollins won the 2006 B.C. Open, which was held at the course, when En-Joie Golf Club (now the site of the Dick's Sporting Goods Open on the Champions Tour) was unavailable due to flooding.

Winners

References

External links

Coverage on the PGA Tour's official site

Former PGA Tour events
Golf in Syracuse, New York
Events in Syracuse, New York